Xenophrys damrei is a species of megophryid toad endemic to Cambodia. It is only known from its type locality, Bokor Plateau in the Dâmrei Mountains of southern Cambodia. The species description was published in 2011 but was based on samples collected by Malcolm Arthur Smith in 1914. The species has not been observed in surveys ever since, although this might reflect seasonal variability.

References

Xenophrys
Endemic fauna of Cambodia
Amphibians of Cambodia
Amphibians described in 2011